Gordon De Main (born Floyd Wood; September 28, 1886 – March 5, 1954)  was an American film actor. He was leading man for the New York-based Excelsior company in the early 1910s, and was later a supporting actor in many films, particularly Westerns.

Born in Washington, Iowa, he was variously credited as Gordon De Maine / DeMain / DeMaine, Gordon Wood(s), G. D. Wood(s), G. A. Wood(s), Bud Wood or J. D. Wood. He died March 5, 1954, in Los Angeles County, California.

Selected filmography
{{div col|content=
The Toll of Mammon (1914) - Dr. John Wright
The Path Forbidden (1914) - Curtis Holmes
When Fate Leads Trump (1914) - Gordon
In the Shadow (1915) - Tom Ward
The Lawbreakers (1915, Short) - Judge Parker
The Hen's Duckling (1915, Short) - Philip Charleroi, Vivienne's Father
The Reward (1915, Short) - John Barrick
The Game of Thrills (1915) - Graves
The Jewelled Dagger of Fate (1915, Short) - Travers
Why Leave Home? (1929) - Roy
Prince Gabby (1929, Short)
The Marriage Playground (1929) - Mr. Delafield
Street of Chance (1930) - Gambler (uncredited)
Young Eagles (1930) - Major Lewis
Men Are Like That (1930) - Rogers the Insurance Man (uncredited)
Pardon My Gun (1930) - Rancher (uncredited)
Headin' North (1930) - Foreman Red
God's Country and the Man (1931) - Slick (uncredited)
Rider of the Plains (1931) - Sheriff John Evans
Up for Murder (1931) - Prosecuting Attorney (uncredited)
The Ridin' Fool (1931) - Sheriff John Andrews
The Lawyer's Secret (1931) - Detective (uncredited)
Ships of Hate (1931) - Ship's First Mate
A Son of the Plains (1931) - Sheriff Matt Woods
Mother and Son (1931) - Joe Connors
The Montana Kid (1931) - Marshal Jack Moore
Near the Trail's End (1931) - Gus - Bartender (uncredited)
The Nevada Buckaroo (1931) - Governor (uncredited)
Oklahoma Jim (1931) - The Croupier (uncredited)
Two Fisted Justice (1931) - Marshal Houston
Cavalier of the West (1931) - Doctor (uncredited)
Forgotten Women (1931) - Walrus
Galloping Thru (1931) - Cliff Warren
Mata Hari (1931) - Ambassador's Aide (uncredited)
Vultures of the Law (1931)
South of Santa Fe (1932) - Granger
 Single-Handed Sanders (1932) - Judge Parker
Spirit of the West (1932) - Bob March (uncredited)
Love Bound (1932) - Flynn, Private Detective (uncredited)
The Wet Parade (1932) - Eye Specialist (uncredited)
 The Arm of the Law (1932) - Coroner
State's Attorney (1932) - Lawn Party Guest (uncredited)
Beauty Parlor (1932) - Arresting Detective (uncredited)
 Honor of the Mounted (1932) - Corporal McCarty
What Price Hollywood? (1932) - The 'Yes' Man (uncredited)
The Washington Masquerade (1932) - Locker Room Host (uncredited)
Skyscraper Souls (1932) - Banker (uncredited)
Broadway to Cheyenne (1932) - Rancher
No Living Witness (1932) - Eddie Schrabe
The Western Code (1932) - Sheriff Fred Purdy
Cowboy Counsellor (1932) - State's Attorney - Replaced by Ted Lorch
The Heart Punch (1932) - Defense Attorney Benton
The Forty-Niners (1932) - Jed Hawkins
The Devil Horse (1932) - Rancher (uncredited)
Behind Jury Doors (1932) - Dr. Emil Lanfield
Lucky Larrigan (1932) - Sheriff Jim
Crashin' Broadway (1932) - Sheriff (uncredited)
Wyoming (1932)
Beyond the Border (1932)
Parachute Jumper (1933) - Narcotics Squad (uncredited)
Grand Slam (1933) - Kibitzer (uncredited)
The Intruder (1933) - Doctor (uncredited)
High Gear (1933) - Maj. Edwards - Military Academy Commandant (uncredited)
 Alimony Madness (1933) - Doctor (uncredited)
The Dude Bandit (1933) - Dad Mason
The Three Musketeers (1933, Serial) - Colonel Duval
Found Alive (1933) - Attorney
The Whispering Shadow (1933, Serial) - Detective [Chs. 1, 5-8] (uncredited)
Song of the Eagle (1933) - Restaurant Owner (uncredited)
Cheating Blondes (1933) - Policeman (uncredited)
Lilly Turner (1933) - Doctor (uncredited)
The Return of Casey Jones (1933) - Ike MacFarland
The Silk Express (1933) - Mill Owner in Association (uncredited)
The Fighting Texans (1933) - Julian Nash
Strange People (1933) - First Detective (uncredited)
The Fugitive (1933) - Nicholson
Rainbow Ranch (1933) - Sheriff
The Devil's Mate (1933) - Butler
The Big Chance (1933) - Ed Miller (uncredited)
 Her Forgotten Past (1933) - Malone (uncredited)
Neighbors' Wives (1933) - Minor Role (uncredited)
The Wolf Dog (1933) - Murphy
Goodbye Love (1933) - Divorce Detective (uncredited)
Mr. Skitch (1933) - Roulette Table Staff (uncredited)
The Lucky Texan (1934) - Banker Williams
Palooka (1934) - Photographers' Official (uncredited)
Beggars in Ermine (1934) - Police Captain (uncredited)
Wonder Bar (1934) - Second Detective (uncredited)
Mystery Liner (1934) - Cmdr. Bryson (uncredited)
Looking for Trouble (1934) - Sergeant Murphy (uncredited)
Fighting to Live (1934) - Al - Jury Foreman (uncredited)
Now I'll Tell (1934) - Fight Announcer (uncredited)
Burn 'Em Up Barnes (1934, Serial) - Tom - Car Owner [Ch. 1] (uncredited)
Chained (1934) - S.S. Official (uncredited)
Gambling House Proprietor (uncredited)Million Dollar Ransom (1934) - Gambling House Proprietor (uncredited)Super Stupid (1934, Short)Port of Lost Dreams (1934) - First Dock Detective (uncredited)We Live Again (1934) - Jury Foreman (uncredited)Fighting Trooper (1934) - Bartender (uncredited)The Firebird (1934) - Policeman (uncredited)In Old Santa Fe (1934) - Bill - Tracy Henchman (uncredited)The Lawless Frontier (1934) - Deputy MillerThe Gay Bride (1934) - Police Sergeant (uncredited)The Best Man Wins (1935) - Salvage Boss (uncredited)The Cactus Kid (1935) - Jake - Bartender (uncredited)Helldorado (1935) - Assayer (uncredited)Behind the Evidence (1935) - Captain GrahamThe Whole Town's Talking (1935) - Minor Role (uncredited)Red Lights Ahead (1936) - Detective (uncredited)Espionage (1937) - Kronsky Aide (uncredited)The Painted Stallion (1937, Serial) - The Governor [Chs. 7-12]The Last Train from Madrid (1937) - Gonzalez (uncredited)A Fight to the Finish (1937) - District Attorney (uncredited)Western Gold (1937) - Secretary Stanton (uncredited)Murder in Greenwich Village (1937) - Captain Bates (uncredited)Submarine D-1 (1937) - Officer (uncredited)Second Chorus (1940) - Elevator Passenger (uncredited)Adventure in Washington (1941) - Senator Day (uncredited)Time Out for Rhythm (1941) - Theatrical Producer (uncredited)Hold Back the Dawn (1941) - Immigration Guard (uncredited)Honky Tonk (1941) - Party Guest (uncredited)International Lady (1941) - DenbyHenry Aldrich for President (1941) - Police Chief (uncredited)Appointment for Love (1941) - Jason (uncredited)Riot Squad (1941) - Plainclothesman (uncredited)West of Tombstone (1942) - Wilfred BarnetCall Out the Marines (1942) - Wise Money Man (uncredited)The Mad Monster (1942) - Professor FitzgeraldThis Gun for Hire (1942) - Superintendent (uncredited)Thundering Hoofs (1942) - Dave UnderwoodAcross the Pacific (1942) - Dock Official (uncredited)King of the Stallions (1942) - Pop ClarkOverland to Deadwood (1942) - George BullockI Married a Witch (1942) - Man with Masterson on Radio (uncredited)Falling Stones (1942)Lady Bodyguard (1943) - Director (uncredited)Chatterbox (1943) - Production Assistant (uncredited) (final film role)
}}

References

External links

Gordon De Main  New York Times'' Movies & TV
kinotv.com

1886 births
1954 deaths
People from Washington, Iowa
American male film actors
20th-century American male actors